Turabad (also, Turabat) is a village in the Zangilan Rayon of Azerbaijan.

Notable natives 
 
 Asad Asadov — National Hero of Azerbaijan.

References

External links

Populated places in Zangilan District